Kwongan is plant community found in south-western Western Australia. The name is a Bibulman Aboriginal term of wide geographical use defined by Beard (1976) as 

 
Kwongan has replaced other terms applied by European botanists such as sand-heide (Diels 1906) or sand heath (Gardner 1942), giving priority to the language of people who have lived continuously in the southwest for more than 50,000 years. Recent archeological evidence shows occupation of the Kwongan for at least 25,500 years.

Thus, kwongan has come again into common usage for the Southwest Australian Floristic Region's shrubland vegetation and associated countryside, equivalent to South Africa's fynbos, California's chaparral, France's maquis and Chile's matorral as seen in these other regions of the world experiencing a Mediterranean climate.

Etymology
As with so many other aspects of the southwest flora, colonial botanist James Drummond was the first to record Bibbelmun usage of the term in an 1839 letter to Kew's Director Sir William Hooker, where  was described as the Noongar name for  An 1839 map of Toodyay Valley Land Grants and Locations has on it the term  two miles east of Bejoording townsite, south of Bolgart (reprinted in Erickson 1969: 32). Moore (1842) gave the spelling  for "a sandy district. The easiest road, or usual path, or mountain pass to a place."

The town of Wongan Hills derives its name from kwongan. Drummond (3 October 1842, republished in Erickson (1969: 165) and in Hercock et al. 2011:313) reported the native name of Guangan Catta, which means hills above the kwongan, when he first saw the hills in the distance accompanied by Cabbinger and an unnamed Bibbelmun guide. An article in the Perth Gazette (1 June 1847) by "Ketoun" reported on "A trip to the Wongan Hills", where on 27 April 1844 his party "...crossed an immense 'gwongan', these gwongans are open undulating patches of scrubby country, ... of a quartz formation." (reprinted in Hercock et al. 2011: 337).

The same term with a different spelling was recorded by pastoralist J.P. Brooks (1896) for the Israelite Bay-Cape Arid district some 900 km SE of Wongan Hills. Approaching from the northeast after traversing the head of the Great Australian Bight, explorer E.J. Eyre in 1840 noted these same "sandy downs, covered with low shrubs or bushes" (Eyre 1845), but was unaware of the local Aboriginal name applied to them.

Bibbelmun people clearly used the term widely, across many dialects and substantial distances in semi-arid country northeast and southeast of Perth.

The first book devoted to kwongan (Pate and Beard 1984) attempted to divorce the application of the term to both sandy countryside and vegetation, as Noongars had used it. Beard and Pate (1984) preferred to apply kwongan strictly to vegetation, defining it technically as:  Thus, they intended to extend use of the term kwongan to shrublands beyond those on sandy soils, such as coastal heaths on limestone and granite, and hill thickets on various rock types. Conforming to Brooks' (1896) definition, scattered trees were also included as a component of kwongan provided they did not dominate the heaths and thickets. The countryside on which kwongan vegetation most commonly occurred was termed "sandplain" by Beard and Pate (1984). This clarification, while helpful for strict vegetation science, removed the use of kwongan well beyond its original Noongar meaning of sand or sandy country, easily traversed because of low scrubby vegetation, occasionally with scattered trees. Such scientific nomenclatural appropriation is controversial today in cross-cultural dialogue. However, a focus on both vegetation and on sandy soils and sand plain will undoubtedly remain important components of kwongan studies, whichever nuance of definition and meaning is favoured.

Kwongan is extensive, occupying about a quarter of the Southwest Australian Floristic Region, and contains 70% of the 8000+ native plant species known from this global biodiversity hotspot (Beard and Pate 1984; Hopper and Gioia 2004). Half of these species are found nowhere else on Earth. This makes kwongan vegetation one of the most significant natural heritage assets in a temperate climatic region, deserving the increasing national and international attention it so richly merits. Kwongan contains an array of plants, animals, micro-organisms and life histories that are both poorly studied and exceptionally diverse, affording opportunities for novel biological discovery (Pate and Beard 1984). Kwongan also offers profound insights into evolution at its most prolonged and sophisticated, on old, climatically-buffered infertile landscapes that are rare on Earth today (Hopper 2009). Bibbelmun people developed and have profound understanding of aspects of kwongan useful to human lifeways (e.g. von Brandenstein 1988) that will become increasingly important in a rapidly changing world.

Conservation
Scientists from the University of Western Australia are proposing the region for World Heritage status.

Further reading

 Beard, J.S. 1976. An indigenous term for the Western Australian sandplain and its vegetation. Journal of the Royal Society of Western Australia 59, 55-57.

 Beard, J.S., Pate, J.S. 1984. Foreword: Kwongan – Plant Life of the Sandplains. Pp xvii-xxi in J.S. Pate & J.S. Beard, eds. Kwongan—Plant Life of the Sandplain. University of Western Australia Press, Ned-lands

 Bindon, P., Chadwick, R., eds. 1992. A Nyoongar wordlist from the south-west of Western Australia. Western Australian Museum, Perth.

 Brooke, J.P. 1896. Natural features of Israelite Bay. Proceedings Australasian Association for the Advancement of Science 6, 561-569.

 Dench, A. 1994. Nyungar. pp. 173–192 in N. Thieberger & W. McGregor, eds, Macquarie Aboriginal Words. The Macquarie Library, Macquarie University, NSW.

 Diels, L. 1906. Die Pflanzenwelt von West-Australien südlich des Wendekreises. Vegn. Erde VIII. Leipzig.

 Douglas, W.H. 1976. The Aboriginal languages of the southwest of Australia. 2nd ed. Australian Institute of Aboriginal Studies, Canberra

 Drummond, J. 1839. Hookers Journal of Botany 2, 307, 356.

 Erickson, R. 1969. The Drummonds of Hawthornden. Lamb Paterson, Osborne Park WA.

 Eyre, E.J. 1845. Journals of expeditions of discovery into central Australia and overland from Adelaide to King George's Sound in the years 1840-1. T. & W. Boone, London.

 Gardner, C.A. 1942. The vegetation of Western Australia with special reference to climate and soils. Journal of the Royal Society of Western Australia 28, 11-87.

 Hercock, M., Milentis, S., Bianchi, P. 2011. Western Australian Exploration 1836 – 1845. Hesperian Press, Victoria Park.

 Hopper, S.D. 2009. OCBIL theory: towards an integrated understanding of the evolution, ecology and conservation of biodiversity on old, climatically-buffered, infertile landscapes. Plant and Soil 322, 49-86.

 Hopper, S.D., Gioia, P. 2004. The Southwest Australian Floristic Region: evolution and conservation of a global hotspot of biodiversity. Annual Review of Ecology, Evolution and Systematics 35, 623-650.

 Lambers, H. (ed.) (2014) "Plant Life on the Sandplains in Southwest Australia, a Global Biodiversity Hotspot". UWA Publishing, Crawley.

 Moore, G.F. (1842). A descriptive vocabulary of the language in common use amongst the Aborigines of Western Australia; with copious meanings, embodying much interesting information regarding the habits, manners, and customs of the natives, and the natural history of the country. William S. Orr and Co., London. Reprinted 1884.

 Moule, M. 2009. A reliable mass propagation system for Ravensthorpe Radish (Platysace deflexa). Centre for Natural Resource Management, The University of Western Australia, Albany.

 Pate, J.S., Beard, J.S., eds. 1984. Kwongan—Plant Life of the Sandplain. University of Western Australia Press, Nedlands. Von Brandenstein, C.G. 1988. Nyungar Anew. Pacific Linguistics Ser. C99, i-xxiv & 1-180.

References

Biogeography of Western Australia
Mediterranean forests, woodlands, and scrub in Australia
Mallee Woodlands and Shrublands
Noongar
Vegetation of Australia
Southwest Australia